The men's T44 (including T43 athletes) 200 metres competition of the athletics events at the 2015 Parapan American Games was held between August 14 at the CIBC Athletics Stadium. The defending Parapan American Games champion was David Prince of Cuba.

Records
Prior to this competition, the existing records were as follows:

T43

T44

Broken records

T43

T44

Schedule
All times are Central Standard Time (UTC-6).

Results
All times are shown in seconds.

Final
Athletes are classified as T44 unless indicated.
Wind: -1.6 m/s

References

Athletics at the 2015 Parapan American Games